List of school districts in Los Angeles County, California, United States

Primary and secondary (K-12)

Public school districts

K-12:

 Acton-Agua Dulce Unified School District
 Alhambra Unified School District
 ABC Unified School District
 Arcadia Unified School District
 Azusa Unified School District
 Baldwin Park Unified School District
 Bassett Unified School District
 Bellflower Unified School District
 Beverly Hills Unified School District
 Bonita Unified School District
 Burbank Unified School District
 Charter Oak Unified School District
 Claremont Unified School District
 Compton Unified School District
 Covina-Valley Unified School District
 Culver City Unified School District
 Downey Unified School District
 Duarte Unified School District
 El Rancho Unified School District
 El Segundo Unified School District
 Glendale Unified School District
 Glendora Unified School District
 Hacienda La Puente Unified School District
 Inglewood Unified School District
 La Cañada Unified School District
 Las Virgenes Unified School District
 Long Beach Unified School District
 Los Angeles Unified School District
 Lynwood Unified School District
 Manhattan Beach Unified School District
 Monrovia Unified School District
 Montebello Unified School District
 Norwalk-La Mirada Unified School District
 Palos Verdes Peninsula Unified School District
 Paramount Unified School District
 Pasadena Unified School District
 Pomona Unified School District
 Redondo Beach Unified School District
 Rowland Unified School District
 San Gabriel Unified School District
 San Marino Unified School District
 Santa Monica-Malibu Unified School District
 Snowline Joint Unified School District
 South Pasadena Unified School District
 Temple City Unified School District
 Torrance Unified School District
 Walnut Valley Unified School District
 West Covina Unified School District
 Wiseburn Unified School District

Secondary:

 Antelope Valley Union Joint High School District
 Centinela Valley Union High School District
 Chaffey Joint Union High School District
 El Monte Union High School District
 Fullerton Joint Union High School District
 Whittier Union High School District
 William S. Hart Union High School District

Elementary:

 Castaic Union School District
 East Whittier City Elementary School District
 Eastside Union Elementary School District
 El Monte City School District
 Garvey Elementary School District
 Gorman Elementary School District
 Hawthorne Elementary School District
 Hermosa Beach City Elementary School District
 Hughes-Elizabeth Lakes Union Elementary School District
 Keppel Union Elementary School District
 Lancaster Elementary School District
 Lawndale Elementary School District
 Lennox Elementary School District
 Little Lake City Elementary School District
 Los Nietos Elementary School District
 Lowell Joint Elementary School District
 Mountain View Elementary School District
 Mount Baldy Joint Elementary School District
 Newhall Elementary School District
 Palmdale Elementary School District
 Rosemead Elementary School District
 Saugus Union Elementary School District
 South Whittier Elementary School District
 Sulphur Springs Union Elementary School District
 Valle Lindo Elementary School District
 Westside Union Elementary School District
 Whittier City Elementary School District
 Wilsona Elementary School District

Former districts:
 Los Angeles City School District
 Los Angeles City High School District (a.k.a. West County Union High School District)
 South Bay Union High School District

Post-secondary

Los Angeles Community College District
Long Beach Community College District
Cerritos Community College District
El Camino Community College District
Rio Hondo Community College District
Mt. San Antonio Community College District
Citrus Community College District
Antelope Valley Community College District
Pasadena Area Community College District
Glendale Community College District
Santa Monica Community College District
Santa Clarita Community College District
Compton Community College District

References

External links

Los Angeles County Office of Education
Los Angeles County Office of Education - School Districts

Los Angeles
 List of school districts in Los Angeles County, California